The 1922 Southern Conference football season was the college football games played by the member schools of the Southern Conference as part of the 1922 college football season.  The season began on September 23 as part of the 1922 college football season. Conference play began on October 7 with Washington & Lee defeating North Carolina State 14–6 in Lexington.

This was the conference's inaugural season, featuring former members of the Southern Intercollegiate Athletic Association (SIAA) and South Atlantic Intercollegiate Athletic Association (SAIAA). Amongst others, conference co-champion Vanderbilt was still a co-member of the SIAA.

Though North Carolina posted the best conference record, most sources listed either Vanderbilt or Georgia Tech as champion. Vanderbilt was the only school to claim a championship and remain undefeated against all opponents.  It posted the nation's number one defense as measured by points against per game and was retroactively selected for a national championship by selector Clyde Berryman.

Intersectionalism was popular. Vanderbilt fought Michigan to a scoreless tie at the inaugural game at Dudley Field, the first football stadium in the south in the style of the Eastern schools. Alabama, which scored 300 points on the season, upset John Heisman's Penn Quakers 9–7.

Auburn's upset of Centre opened the door for the SoCon champion to claim a championship of the South. It was considered one of best teams Auburn turned out in the first half of the 20th century.  Centre quarterback Herb Covington had made a "world record" six drop kick field goals against Louisville.

Vanderbilt end Lynn Bomar and Georgia Tech halfback Red Barron were unanimous All-Southern selections and second-team Walter Camp All-Americans.

Season overview

Results and team statistics

Key

PPG = Average of points scored per game
PAG = Average of points allowed per game

Regular season

SoCon teams in bold.

Week One

Week Two

Week Three

Week Four

Week Five

Week Six

Week Seven

Week Eight

Week Nine

Week Ten

Week Eleven

Awards and honors

All-Americans

E – Lynn Bomar, Vanderbilt (WC-2; WE-3 [tackle]; BE; FM-1)
T – Joe Bennett, Georgia (BE)
G – Oscar Davis, Georgia Tech (LP-1; BE)
QB – Doc Kuhn, Vanderbilt (BE)
HB – Red Barron, Georgia Tech (WC-2 [fb]; BE; FM-2)
FB – John Fletcher, Georgia (BE)

All-Southern team

The following is the composite All-Southern team compiled from twenty four coaches and sporting editors of the South, each of whom received trophies from the Atlanta Journal:

See also
1922 Michigan vs. Vanderbilt football game
1922 Alabama vs. Penn football game

References